Memory Lost is a 2016 Chinese streaming television series produced by iQiyi, starring Yang Rong and Bai Yu. It is based on the detective trilogy of the same name by Ding Mo. The series premiered on 24 October 2016 via iQiyi, and aired for three seasons.

The series has a total of 2.3 billion online views, and also gained an international following.

Synopsis 
Highly intelligent police officer Bai Jingxi works with her partner Han Chen to solve many difficult cases using her outstanding deductive reasoning.

Season One
A misunderstanding causes Bai Jingxi and Han Chen to meet. The two meet again while solving a rape case, and Bai Jingxi discovers that Han Chen is actually an experienced criminal police, and his use of traditional investigation methods impresses her. The two resolves their misunderstandings and develops feelings for each other. Because of an incident five years ago, Han Chen loses part of his memory, but remembers that he has a fiancee. In order to find the woman, he tries all sorts of methods, while rejecting the growing love between him and Bai Jingxi. Later, Bai Jingxi was deployed to the same team as Han Chen to investigate a bizarre incident. As the two protects each other in the midst of dangers, Han Chen realizes that he truly loves Bai Jingxi. He promises her that he will answer to her after discovering the truth behind his lost memories.

Season Two 
Han Chen eventually discovers that Bai Jingxi is actually his long-lost fiancee, Su Mian. An incident which stemmed from serial murder case five years ago was the cause of their lost memories. Under a single alphabet code name, the members of the criminal organization kill people for fun. When they were about to be arrested, they released a bomb and kidnapped Su Mian, thereafter changing her identity to that of her cousin's, whom they kill. Han Chen and Su Mian slowly recover their memories; and just when they were about to team up and confront the criminal organization, they found out that the psychotic killers were already right beside them.

Season Three
Under Han Chen and Su Mian's persistent chase, the criminal organization sends out a declaration letter. The city was instantly plagued with dangers, starting from the explosion of bomb jackets in the city square. Han Chen and Su Mian set out to stop the murderers, and in the process discover their actual identities. The leader of the organization, code-named S, is actually Su Mian's good friend Xu Sibai. Xu's father was the murderer of Su Mian's father. Xu has actually had a crush on Su Mian for years, but because of her rejection, had developed a grudge against her. Five years ago, Xu had planned a huge conspiracy to fake the death of Su Mian. Bai Jingxi, who is actually Su Mian's cousin and looked like her, actually died in place of Su Mian; while Su Mian took on Bai Jingxi's identity. This incident causes Han Chen, Su Mian as well as Xu Sibai to have their memories erased simultaneously, thus allowing Xu Sibai to stay by Su Mian's side. All the members of the Murder Organization died and Xu Sibai was also assumed to be dead. However, after the case was closed, a portrait of Su Mian was left on the roadside, bearing the signature of S.

Cast

Soundtrack

See also
Love Me If You Dare (2015)
When a Snail Falls in Love (2016)

References

Chinese crime television series
2016 Chinese television series debuts
IQIYI original programming
Chinese web series
Television shows based on works by Ding Mo
Television series by Huanyu Film
2016 web series debuts
Crime drama web series